is a passenger railway station located in the city of Hachiōji, Tokyo, Japan, operated by the private railway operator Keio Corporation.

Lines 

Station layout 
This station consists of two ground-level opposed side platforms serving two tracks, connected by a footbridge.

Platforms

History
The station opened on October 1, 1967.

Passenger statistics
In fiscal 2019, the station was used by an average of 7,820  passengers daily. 

The passenger figures (boarding passengers only) for previous years are as shown below.

Surrounding area
 Japan Swimming School Hachioji
 National College of Technology Headquarters

See also
 List of railway stations in Japan

References

External links

Keio Railway Station Information 

Keio Takao Line
Stations of Keio Corporation
Railway stations in Tokyo
Railway stations in Japan opened in 1967
Hachiōji, Tokyo